Stanisław Bohusz-Siestrzeńcewicz (11 November 1869, in Vilnius – 24 May 1927, in Warsaw) was a Polish-Lithuanian painter and illustrator.

Biography 
He was born to a noble family. In 1888, he began his artistic studies at the Imperial Academy of Arts in Saint Petersburg under Bogdan Willewalde. This was followed by enrollment at the Académie Julian in Paris. Later, he took private lessons from Józef Brandt at his studio in Munich and married his daughter Krystyną. They were divorced in 1905.

He specialized in genre scenes and landscapes from the villages and rural areas around Vilnius and held frequent exhibitions at the "Towarzystwo Zachęty Sztuk Pięknych"  (Society for the Promotion of Fine Arts) and the salon of the noted art collector , both in Warsaw, where he lived for several years after 1900. He also lived in Poznan.

His sketches and pen drawings were gathered together in a large album in 1912 and published by B. Wierzbicki & Co. He was also a popular portraitist and his drawings were regularly featured in the Tygodnik Illustrowany. Several works by Eliza Orzeszkowa feature his illustrations. In 1906, he created an allegory on the advancement of knowledge for the ceiling of the staircase in Warsaw's "House of Technology".

In addition to his art, he was a co-organizer and director of "Achów" (outrage); cabaret pieces that were presented during the annual Shrovetide carnival in Vilnius from 1904 to 1914. He was a lecturer at Vilnius University from 1919 to 1920.

For many years, he suffered from tuberculosis and died of that disease while seeking treatment in Warsaw.

Selected paintings

References

External links 

1869 births
1927 deaths
Polish painters
Polish male painters
Genre painters
Académie Julian alumni
Polish illustrators
Artists from Vilnius
20th-century deaths from tuberculosis
Tuberculosis deaths in Poland